Give station is a railway station serving the railway town of Give in Southern Denmark.

Give station is located on the Vejle-Holstebro railway line. The station opened in 1894 with the opening of the Vejle-Give section of the Vejle-Holstebro Line. The stations offers direct InterCityLyn services to Copenhagen and Struer operated by the railway company DSB as well as regional train services to Vejle, Herning and Struer operated by Arriva.

See also
 List of railway stations in Denmark

References

Citations

Bibliography

External links

 Banedanmark – government agency responsible for maintenance and traffic control of most of the Danish railway network
 DSB – largest Danish train operating company
 Arriva – British multinational public transport company operating bus and train services in Denmark
 Danske Jernbaner – website with information on railway history in Denmark

Railway stations opened in 1894
Railway stations in the Region of Southern Denmark
Railway stations in Denmark opened in the 19th century